Zhou Zhaoqian (born 11 October 1997) is a Chinese Paralympic athlete competing to the T54 category.

Biography
Having been injured in a car accident at the age of five, which saw doctors forced to amputate her right leg, Zhou started practicing para-athletics in 2012. In 2018, she wore the shirt of the Chinese national team for the first time at the 2018 Asian Para Games in Jakarta, where she won two gold medals in the 100 and 200 meters and the silver medal in the 400 meters.

At the 2019 World Para Athletics Championships, Zhou finished second in the 100 meters, while she reached the fourth and seventh position in the 400 and 1500 meters respectively. In 2021, she took part in the 2020 Summer Paralympics, where she won the gold medal in the 100 and 1500 meters and won the bronze medal in the 400 meters.

References

1997 births
Living people
Paralympic athletes of China
Chinese female wheelchair racers
Paralympic gold medalists for China
Paralympic bronze medalists for China
Athletes (track and field) at the 2020 Summer Paralympics
Medalists at the 2020 Summer Paralympics
Medalists at the World Para Athletics Championships
Paralympic medalists in athletics (track and field)